Bernadette Ní Ghallchóir (born 1947 or 1948) is an Irish television presenter and continuity announcer. She was a familiar face of RTÉ between the late sixties and early eighties.

Career
In the late 1960’s, Ní Ghallchóir (using the name Bernadette Gallagher) worked briefly as a primary school teacher in London, teaching at the George Tomlinson School in Leytonstone.

Ní Ghallchóir hosted the Irish language show Buntús Cainte in the 1960s. She is probably best remembered for hosting the 1971 Eurovision Song Contest from the Gaiety Theatre in Dublin, she continued to be involved with Eurovision when in 1973 she hosted National Song Contest.

When RTÉ Two was launched in 1978, Ní Ghallchóir was one of the first presenters who officially opened the channel with Raymond Maxwell and Roisin Harkin. She presented Trachtaireacht ("commentary") on RTÉ at that time.

In the 1980s, she retired from television and began a career as a sculptor. She is married to Seán Ó hUigínn, the former Ambassador of Ireland to the United States.

See also
List of Eurovision Song Contest presenters

References

External links 
Bio at National Irish Visual Arts Library

20th-century Irish people
21st-century Irish people
Living people
RTÉ television presenters
Radio and television announcers
Spouses of Irish politicians
Alumni of the University of Galway
Alumni of the University of London
1947 births